Oy Lokomo Ab was a Finnish manufacturer of railroad equipment and steam locomotives, situated in Tampere, Finland. The company was founded in 1915 by a group of Finnish businesspeople, including Jalmar Castrén and Emil Aaltonen. The Lokomo factories in Tampere produced the MIR submersibles for the Soviet Academy of Sciences. They later merged into the Metso Corporation. Jaakko Syrjä was a worker for the company.

See also
 Finnish Railway Museum
 VR Group
 List of Finnish locomotives
 Jokioinen Museum Railway
 List of railway museums Worldwide
 Heritage railways
 List of heritage railways
 Restored trains
 Hanko–Hyvinkää railway
 History of rail transport in Finland
 VR Class Pr1
 VR Class Hr1
 VR Class Tr1
 VR Class Tk3
 VR Class Hr11

References 

Companies formerly listed on Nasdaq Helsinki
Defunct locomotive manufacturers of Finland